Ṣāliḥ ibn Tarīf (Arabic: صالح بن طريف) was the second king of the Berghouata kingdom, the prophet of a new Judeo-Christian religion, and the eponymous ancestor of the Oulad Salah tribe of Morocco. He appeared during the caliphate of Hisham ibn Abd al-Malik in 744 AD. 

The eleventh century Andalusian scholars Al-Bakri reports that Salih was a Judean (Yahūd) and claimed descent from Simeon son of Jacob, son of Isaac. According to Ibn Khaldun's sources, he claimed to have received a new revelation from God, with 80 chapters, some called after prophets, such as Adam, Noah, and others after other things, such as the Duck, the Camel, the Elephant, Harut and Marut, Iblis and "Chapter of the Wonders of the World"; they read these chapters in their prayers.  He established laws for his people, and was called by them "Ṣāliḥ al-Mu'minin" (Restorer of the Believers.)  This claimed revelation was written in the Berber language, and called a Qur'an.

He is also said to have claimed to be the final Mahdi, and that Isa (Jesus) would be his companion and pray behind him. He proclaimed that his name in Arabic was Ṣāliḥ, in Syriac Mālik, in "Persian" ālim, in Hebrew Rūbyā, and in Berber Werba, and that after him would be no other prophet.

After reaching the age of 47 years, he headed east out of the kingdom, and promised to return in the reign of their seventh king. He told his son Ilyās to support the Umayyads of Andalus and publicly profess Islam, but to reveal his religion when he became powerful enough; the latter was done by his grandson Yūnus.

According to some sources, Ṣāliḥ ibn Tarīf regarded himself as a successor to Muhammad, had 10 Ṣahāba (disciples) and many wives, and claimed to be able to speak with the dead and heal the sick.

Other tenets that contrast with Islam include capital punishment for theft, unlimited number of wives a man allowed to have, fasting of the month of Rajab (7th month in lunar calendar) instead of Ramadan (9th month), ten obligatory daily prayers instead of five, differences in how to perform ablution, prayers, and the banning of marriage between cousins. The details of the tenets of Ṣāliḥ's religion are mentioned in many Arabic sources, such as Ibn Hazm, Ibn Khaldun and others.

In Islamic literature, his belief is considered heretical; politically, its motivation was presumably to establish their independence from the Umayyads (in a manner analogous to Kharijism, and earlier Donatism), establishing an independent ideology lending legitimacy to the state.  Some modern Berber activists consider him to be Berber and regard him as a hero for his resistance to Umayyad-Arab conquest and his foundation of the Berghouata state.

The religion promoted by Ṣāliḥ was destroyed in the 11th century by the Almoravids.

See also 
List of Mahdi claimants

References

External links
 Article on Berghouata in French
 Arabic biography of Salih

Year of birth missing
Year of death missing
Founders of religions
8th-century rulers in Africa
Moroccan religious leaders
8th-century Berber people